Adriatic–Ionian motorway (Bosnian and ; Montenegrin and ) or Trieste-Kalamata Highway or the Blue Corridor, is a future motorway that will stretch along the entire eastern shore of the Adriatic and Ionian seas, spanning the western coast of the Balkan peninsula from Italy in the north through Slovenia, Croatia, Montenegro, Albania to Greece in the south.

Overview 

The road is planned to be built to full motorway standards. It will start in Trieste, Italy, pass through Slovenia, enter Croatia near Rijeka, and continue through Croatia as part of A1 motorway. Road will be connected to Montenegro through Croatia if via Pelješac Bridge. Passing Ulcinj, the motorway will enter Albania south of Lake Skadar, and continue south, passing Shkodër, Tirana, Rrogozhinë, Fier and Gjirokastër. Exiting Albania, the motorway will follow the Greek section of E55 route, ending at Kalamata.

The road is seen as a matter of national importance to Croatia, Montenegro and Albania. Those countries have launched an initiative to list the motorway with Pan-European corridors in order to be able to secure foreign funding.

Italy 
With starting of Adriatic–Ionian motorway at Trieste, the already existing feeder road RA 13 to the Slovenian border is used. The RA 13 is connected to the Slovenian A3 highway.

Slovenia 
The Slovenian section starts with the already existing A3 from the Italian border at Sežana to the interconnection with the A1. The further route isn't planned yet, but will lead to the Croatian border near Jelšane where it will be connected with the Croatian A7 highway. Until construction of that part, the traffic is passed over a national road.

Croatia 

In Croatia, the Adriatic–Ionian motorway is planned to follow routes of the A7 motorway along its entire length, and the A1 motorway from the Žuta Lokva interchange to the Border crossing Nova Sela.

So far, Croatia has made the biggest progress on its section by completing significant parts of the A7 motorway and the A1 motorway.

The A7 is completed from the Slovenian border at Rupa, bypassing Rijeka and connecting to the A6. Construction of the part from this junction to a planned interchange with the A1 at Žuta Lokva is currently slowed down and planned as a long-term project. Until completion of this sector, the traffic may either use an indirect route to the A1 via the A6 motorway (to the junction of the A1 and A6 motorways at Bosiljevo 2 interchange) or a more direct route to the A1 via the D8 state road (also known as Adriatic Highway).

Adriatic-Ionian motorway follows the route of the A1 motorway from the Žuta Lokva interchange to the Border crossing Nova Sela where it connects to the A1 motorway in Bosnia and Herzegovina.

Bosnia and Herzegovina 
It has not yet been defined whether a motorway will pass through southern Bosnia and Herzegovina near Trebinje. A route passing through the Trebinje field would require approval of both the Herzegovina-Neretva Canton and Republika Srpska.

Montenegro 

In the Spatial Plan of Montenegro, route of the Adriatic – Ionian motorway is currently defined as following:

 Nudo (border with Bosnia and Herzegovina) - Grahovo - Čevo - (Podgorica) Mareza - (Podgorica) Smokovac - Dinoša - Božaj (Border with Albania)

Thus, Government of Montenegro has considered only the option of motorway crossing southern Bosnia and Hercegovina near Trebinje. A parallel expressway along the coast is also planned, that will connect directly to Croatian road network at Debeli Brijeg, however, this is not considered a part of Adriatic – Ionian route, and will not be built to full motorway standard. This route is intended to relieve Adriatic Highway, and will follow the Montenegrin coastline closely, with Verige bridge included in its route.

Approximate length of motorway through Montenegro is 100 km, of which 10 km between Mareza and Smokovac is shared with Belgrade–Bar motorway.

Building of the Belgrade–Bar motorway is currently a priority for Montenegro, and concrete activities on building Adriatic – Ionian motorway are yet to begin.

Albania 

Albania has mostly completed its north-south corridor (SH1 and SH4) connecting Montenegro with Greece. Remaining parts of the corridor are planned to be expanded to full motorway standard like building new sections between Muriqan/Sukobin border crossing to SH1 at Bushat south of Shkodër, Thumane-Kashar-Rrogozhina highway part of Milot-Fier upgrade to motorway standard linking with Fier Bypass, and expanding SH4 south of Fier with slight deviation at Pocem near Memaliaj. The motorway in Albania will pass on the current stretch along the western lowland, bypass Tirana through newly planned Thumane-Kashar-Rrogozhine motorway, continue south on the existing SH4, and enter inland at Fier towards Tepelene and Gjirokaster. Less than half of the above segments are single carriageways known as superstradë, while segments SH4 Rrogozhine-Fier and A1 Milot-Thumanë have been widened to dual carriageways known as autostradë.

Greece 
In Greece the Adriatic-Ionian motorway follows the GR-5 from the Albanian Border at Kakavia up to Ioannina, a section planned to be upgraded to a motorway. From there it follows the A5 motorway (Ionia Odos) up until Antirrio where it crosses the Corinthian Gulf via the Rio-Antirrio bridge to meet the A8 motorway (Olympia Odos) at Rio.

From Rio to Pyrgos, another motorway (which is going to be the extension of the Olympia Odos-A5), is under construction to replace that section of the existing national road GR-9. The other section from Pyrgos to Kalo Nero is delayed due to environmental concerns about the Kaiafas Lake. The Kalo Nero - Tsakona road is a branch of the GR-9 and it leads to the intersection with the A7 motorway, near the city of Kalamata.

See also 
Adriatic Highway
Transport in Slovenia
Transport in Croatia
Transport in Montenegro
Transport in Bosnia and Herzegovina
Transport in Albania
Transport in Greece

References

External links 
 Adriatic – Ionian Transport Corridor on the Territory of the Republic of Croatia

Roads in Albania
Roads in Croatia
Roads in Montenegro
Proposed roads
Proposed transport infrastructure in Albania
Proposed transport infrastructure in Croatia
Proposed transport infrastructure in Montenegro